Stonemyia is a genus of flies in the family Tabanidae.

Species
Stonemyia amamiensis Yonetsu, 2000
Stonemyia bazini (Surcouf, 1922)
Stonemyia californica (Bigot, 1892)
Stonemyia caucasica (Kröber, 1921)
Stonemyia ishizuchiensis Yonetsu, 1987
Stonemyia fera Williston, 1887
Stonemyia hirticallus Chen & Cao, 1982
Stonemyia isabellina (Wiedemann, 1828)
Stonemyia rasa (Loew, 1869)
Stonemyia tigris (Bigot, 1880)
Stonemyia tranquilla (Osten Sacken, 1875)
Stonemyia velutina (Bigot, 1892)
Stonemyia yezoensis (Shiraki, 1918)

References

Tabanidae
Brachycera genera
Diptera of Asia
Diptera of North America